Iberian Romani or Ibero-Romani may refer to:

Iberian Kale, an ethnic group native to Iberia and Southern France
Iberian-Romance Romani (Caló) and Basque Romani (Erromintxela) languages (both regarded as Para-Romani)